Jiří Novák and David Rikl were the defending champions but lost in the quarterfinals to Tomás Carbonell and Nicolás Lapentti.

Roger Federer and Marat Safin won the final 0–1 after Michael Hill and Jeff Tarango were forced to retire.

Seeds
Champion seeds are indicated in bold text while text in italics indicates the round in which those seeds were eliminated.

  Jiří Novák /  David Rikl (quarterfinals)
  Petr Pála /  Pavel Vízner (quarterfinals)
  Michael Hill /  Jeff Tarango (final)
  Pablo Albano /  Lucas Arnold (first round)

Draw

External links
 2001 UBS Open Doubles Draw

Swiss Open (tennis)
2001 ATP Tour
Swiss Open